Baćina may refer to:

 Baćina, Croatia
 Baćina, Bosnia and Herzegovina